Chandlodia is an area under Ahmedabad Municipal Corporation in Ahmedabad district  in the state of Gujarat, India.

Demographics
 India census, Chandlodiya had a population of 56,135. Males constitute 54% of the population and females 46%. Chandlodiya has an average literacy rate of 74%, higher than the national average of 59.5%; with male literacy of 79% and female literacy of 68%. 12% of the population is under 6 years of age.

References

Neighbourhoods in Ahmedabad